Parachma is a genus of snout moths. This genus is allied to Caphys Walker, 1863 Acallis  Ragonot, 1891 and Zabobar  Dyar, 1914.

Species
 Parachma atripunctalis  Hampson 1906
 Parachma dilutior  Rothschild 1913
 Parachma fervidalis  Dyar, 1914
 Parachma huralis  Dyar 1914
 Parachma ignefusalis Hampson 1906
 Parachma lutealis Hampson, 1897
 Parachma meterythra Hampson, 1897
 Parachma lequettealis Guillermot, 2011
 Parachma ochracealis  Walker, 1866
 Parachma pallidalis Hampson 1906
 Parachma phoenicochroa  Hampson 1916
 Parachma rufitinctalis  Hampson 1916
 Parachma rufoflavalis Hampson 1906
 Parachma thermalis  Hampson 1906

All moths of this species occur in the Americas, except P.laquettealis from La Réunion (Indian Ocean).

Former species
 Basacallis tarachodes (Dyar, 1914)

References
Walker, 1866a. List of the Specimens of Lepidopterous Insects in the Collection of the British Museum. Part XXXIV.– Supplement Part 4.  — 34 (1965):i–iv, 1121–1533

Chrysauginae
Pyralidae genera